Ayesha Hazarika  (born 15 December 1975) is a Scottish broadcaster, journalist and political commentator, and former political adviser to senior Labour Party politicians.

Early life
Hazarika was born in Coatbridge, Scotland, to parents of Indian Muslim descent, and was educated at Laurel Bank, a private all-girls school in Glasgow, Scotland. She studied law at the University of Hull.

Comedy 
While working as a press officer at the Department of Trade and Industry, Hazarika was persuaded by a friend to take a comedy course run by comedian Logan Murray. She began to perform paid comedy gigs alongside her day job at the DTI. In 2003, Hazarika was a semi-finalist in the Channel 4 stand-up comedy competition So You Think You're Funny. However, her comedy took a back seat after 2007 as she focused on her developing career as a political adviser.

Hazarika made a return to stand-up in 2016, performing a show at the Edinburgh Festival Fringe inspired by her time in politics. In 2017, she brought a new show, State of the Nation, to Edinburgh. In December 2018, Hazarika appeared on series 56 episode 10 of Have I Got News for You as Ian Hislop's teammate; a role she reprised on 7 May 2020 during the "Lockdown" series.

Political adviser and commentator
From 2007 to 2015, Hazarika served as a political adviser to senior Labour Party figures, including Harriet Harman and Ed Miliband, including during the 2010 and 2015 general elections which returned a Conservative minority and majority respectively. After leaving her role working for Harman in the aftermath of the 2015 general election, Hazarika was awarded an MBE in the 2016 New Year Honours list for political service. It was reported at the time that Harman had proposed that Hazarika receive a peerage, but Miliband had elevated another former adviser to the House of Lords instead.

Describing herself as a "moderate" within the Labour Party, Hazarika urged Jeremy Corbyn to resign after the Copeland by-election in early 2017. Following the 2017 general election, she acknowledged "I got it wrong on Corbyn", and urged "my fellow Labour colleagues to acknowledge Corbyn's success and to try to find peace with him".

As well as returning to stand-up comedy following her departure from Westminster, Hazarika has since become a regular commentator in the media, including as a columnist for The Scotsman and the London Evening Standard. In September 2017, Hazarika was listed at Number 75 in the '100 Most Influential People on the Left' by commentator Iain Dale. In 2018, she co-authored the book Punch and Judy Politics: An Insiders' Guide to Prime Minister’s Questions with fellow Labour speechwriter and special adviser Tom Hamilton.

In June 2020, she was one of the launch presenters of the Times Radio digital radio station, presenting Saturday and Sunday drivetime shows.

References

1975 births
Living people
Alumni of the University of Hull
20th-century women writers
Scottish women comedians
Scottish political commentators
People from Coatbridge
British politicians of Indian descent
Scottish columnists
Scottish Muslims
Scottish women columnists
Scottish people of Indian descent
British special advisers
Members of the Order of the British Empire